Henri Cappetta is a French ichthyologist specializing in the paleontology of sharks and rays.

References

 H. Cappetta, Handbook of Paleoichthyology (Gustav Fischer, 1987)

External links
 Henri Cappetta on www.isem.cnrs.fr (French)
 New sharks and rays from the Cenomanian and Turonian of Charentes, France. Romain Vullo, Henri Cappetta and Didier Néraudeau, Acta Palaeontol. Pol. 52 (1), pp. 99–116, 2007

French ichthyologists
Living people
Year of birth missing (living people)